Regionalism is a political ideology that seeks to increase the political power, influence and self-determination of the people of one or more subnational regions. It focuses on the "development of a political or social system based on one or more" regions and/or the national, normative or economic interests of a specific region, group of regions or another subnational entity, gaining strength from or aiming to strengthen the "consciousness of and loyalty to a distinct region with a homogeneous population", similarly to nationalism. More specifically, "regionalism refers to three distinct elements: movements demanding territorial autonomy within unitary states; the organization of the central state on a regional basis for the delivery of its policies including regional development policies; political decentralization and regional autonomy".

Regions may be delineated by administrative divisions, culture, language and religion, among others. Regionalists' demands occur in "strong" forms, such as sovereignty, separatism, secession and independence, as well as more moderate campaigns for greater autonomy (such as states' rights, decentralization or devolution). Strictly, regionalists favour confederations over unitary nation states with strong central governments. They may, however, embrace intermediate forms of federalism.

Proponents of regionalism usually claim that strengthening the governing bodies and political powers within a region, at the expense of a centralized government, will benefit local populations by improving regional or local economies, in terms of better fiscal responsibility, regional development, allocation of resources, implementation of localist policies and plans, competitiveness among regions and, ultimately, the whole country, consistent with the principle of subsidiarity.

Regionalism, autonomism, and nationalism
Regionalism, autonomism, secessionism, and nationalism are interrelated concepts, yet they often have different and sometimes opposite meanings. For instance, in Spain "regionalism" is regarded as strongly associated with "nationalism" and, often, "secessionism", whereas in Italy, it is generally seen as a synonym of "federalism" and the opposite of "nationalism". In some cases movements or parties campaigning for independence may push for federalism or autonomy within the pre-existing nation state.

In developed, Western, liberal-democratic countries, secessionist parties include the Parti Québécois in Quebec (Canada), the Basque Nationalist Party and Euskal Herria Bildu in the Basque Country (Spain and France), the New Flemish Alliance and Vlaams Belang in Flanders (Belgium), the Catalan European Democratic Party and the Republican Left of Catalonia in Països Catalans (Spain and France), the Galician Nationalist Bloc and the Galician Left Alternative in Galicia (Spain), the Scottish National Party and the Scottish Green Party in Scotland, Plaid Cymru in Wales and, to some extent, Sinn Féin in Northern Ireland (United Kingdom).

In developing countries they include the Polisario Front in Western Sahara (Morocco), the National Movement for the Liberation of Azawad in Azawad (Mali), the Front for the Liberation of the Enclave of Cabinda in the Cabinda Province (Angola), and all national liberation movements.

Federalist/autonomist regional parties include the Coalition Avenir Québec in Quebec (Canada), the New Progressive Party of Puerto Rico and the Popular Democratic Party in Puerto Rico (a commonwealth of the United States), Lega Nord in Northern Italy (the party has, at times, advocated Padania's independence and its "national section" in Veneto, Liga Veneta, is a proponent of Venetian independence), the Party of the Corsican Nation in Corsica (France), the Martinican Progressive Party in Martinique and the Communist Party of Réunion in Réunion (both French overseas territories), and the New Macau Association in Macau (China).

In some countries, the development of regionalist politics may be a prelude to further demands for greater autonomy or even full separation, especially when ethnic, cultural and economic disparities are present. This was demonstrated, among other examples, in the Socialist Federal Republic of Yugoslavia in the early 1990s.

Regional vs. regionalist political parties
Political parties that are regional are not necessarily regionalist parties. A "regional party" is any political party with its base in a single region, whatever its objectives and platform may be, whereas "regionalist" parties are a subset of regional parties that specifically campaign for greater autonomy or independence in their region.

Because regional parties – including regionalist parties – often cannot receive enough votes or legislative seats to be politically powerful, they may join political coalitions or seek to be part of a coalition government. Notable examples include the Sinn Féin's participation in the Northern Ireland Executive since 1999, the New Flemish Alliance's participation in the Federal Government of Belgium in 2014-2019, and Lega Nords frequent participation in the Italian government.

Examples of regional parties that do not generally campaign for greater autonomy or federalism include most provincial parties in Canada, most regional and minority parties in Europe, notably including the Christian Social Union in Bavaria (Germany), most parties in Belgium, most parties in Northern Ireland, the Istrian Democratic Assembly in Istria and the Alliance of Primorje-Gorski Kotar in Primorje-Gorski Kotar (both counties of Croatia), and most political parties in India.

Regional parties with an autonomist/federalist or secessionist agendas have included the aforementioned Bloc Québécois, Lega Nord, the Vlaams Belang, the New Flemish Alliance, the Catalan European Democratic Party, the Republican Left of Catalonia, the Scottish National Party, Plaid Cymru, and Sinn Féin

See also

Lists
Lists of regional and regionalist parties are available at:
List of political parties campaigning for self-government
List of historical separatist movements
:Category:Independence movements
:Category:Regionalist parties
:Category:Political parties of minorities
List of regional and minority parties in Europe
Lists of active separatist movements
European Free Alliance

Concepts
Self-determination
Self-governance
Autonomism
Subnational citizenship
Decentralization
Federalism
Separatism
Secession
Souverainism
Glocalisation
Think globally, act locally
Localism
Parochialism
Ethnic group
Minority group
Political parties of minorities
Country (identity)

CountriesAustralia: West Australian secessionism; Tasmanian secessionism; proposals for new StatesBelgium: Communities, regions and language areas; Languages; Economic regional differencesBrazil: Regions; Languages; Nationalisms and regionalisms (Sao Paulo independence movement, South Region independence movement)Canada: Languages; Provinces; Maritime Rights Movement; Quebec nationalism (Quebec sovereignty movement); Western alienation (Alberta separatism, Cascadian independence movement)China: Languages; Ethnic groups; Nationalisms and regionalisms (Hong Konger nationalism/autonomy, Inner Mongolian nationalism, Taiwanese nationalism/independence movement, Tibetan nationalism, Uyghur nationalism)Croatia: Minority languages; nationalisms and regionalisms (Dalmatianism, Istrianism)Denmark: Languages; Danish dialects; Realm; Nationalisms and regionalisms; Faroese nationalism (Faroese independence movement); Greenlandic nationalism (Greenlandic independence movement)France: Nationalisms and regionalisms (Basque nationalism, Breton nationalism, Corsican nationalism, Occitan nationalism)Germany: German dialects; Nationalisms and reginonalisms (Bavarian nationalism)Italy: Languages; North–South divide; Nationalisms and regionalisms (Friuli Movement; Lombard nationalism; Padanian nationalism; Sardinian nationalism; Sicilian nationalism; Southern Italy autonomist movements; South Tyrolean secessionist movement; Venetian nationalism)Romania: Languages; ethnic minorities; nationalisms and regionalisms (Székely autonomy movement)Russia: Languages; Nationalisms and regionalisms (Chechen nationalism, Circassian nationalism, Siberian regionalism), Insurgency in the North CaucasusSouth Africa: Languages; Afrikaner nationalism (Volkstaat)Spain: Languages; Nationalisms and regionalisms (Andalusian nationalism, Aragonese nationalism, Asturian nationalism, Basque nationalism, Canarian nationalism, Castilian nationalism, Catalan nationalism, Galician nationalism, Leonesism, Valencian nationalism etc.)United Kingdom: Countries; Languages; North–South divide; Nationalisms (Cornish nationalism–devolution, English nationalism–independence, Irish nationalism–republicanism, Scottish nationalism–independence, Ulster nationalism, Welsh nationalism–independence)United States''': Secessionism; Free State Project, Alaskan independence, Yes California, Cascadian independence movement, Hawaiian sovereignty movement, Neo-Confederate movements, Northwest Territorial Imperative, Puerto Rico independence movement, Texas secession movements, Second Vermont Republic

Notes

References
 Smith-Peter, Susan (2018). Imagining Russian Regions: Subnational Identity and Civil Society in Nineteenth-Century Russia. Leiden: Brill. 
 Smith-Peter, Susan (2018) "The Six Waves of Russian Regionalism in European Context, 1830-2000," in Russia's Regional Identities: The Power of the Provinces'', ed. Edith W. Clowes, Gisela Erbsloh and Ani Kokobobo. New York: Routledge, 15-43.

External links

 
Political ideologies
Regions
Decentralization